Robert Brian James  (1912 – 3 August 1944) was a British Army officer of the Second World War. He was awarded the Distinguished Service Order (DSO) three times. He was the only son of Herbert Henry James and Laura Brind James of 58 Norfolk Road, Littlehampton. At the time of his death he was the commanding officer of the 5th Battalion, East Yorkshire Regiment, an infantry unit. He is buried in Hottot-les-Bagues Military Cemetery, Hottot-les-Bagues, Normandy.

First DSO was gazetted in 1941 for services in the Middle East. First Bar to the DSO was gazetted in June 1943 for service in the Middle East. Second Bar to the DSO was gazetted in October 1943 for services in Sicily as part of Operation Husky.

His service number was 53746.

References

1912 births
1944 deaths
British Army personnel killed in World War II
Companions of the Distinguished Service Order
People from Littlehampton
Date of birth missing
East Yorkshire Regiment officers
Essex Regiment officers
Military personnel from Lincolnshire